The 2016–17 WRU Championship was the fifth season of the WRU Championship, the second tier of club rugby in Wales run by the Welsh Rugby Union. It is the first season to feature 12 teams, reduced from 14 in previous seasons. The next two seasons will be "ring-fenced" with the champion club not being promoted due to changes in the 2016–17 Principality Premiership. The competition was won by Pontypool. The bottom two clubs that were relegated were Glamorgan Wanderers (to 1 East Central) and Dunvant (to 1 West).

Structure 
Each team in the Championship will play each other twice on a home and away basis for a total of 22 matches played each. The team with the most points at the end of the season will be declared the winners. The winning club will not be promoted due to "ring-fencing" of the Premiership. The bottom two clubs at the end of the season will be relegated to Division 1 (based on geographical location).

Teams 
Last year's champions Merthyr were promoted alongside Swansea, Bargoed and RGC 1404 into the newly formatted 2016–17 Principality Premiership. Bridgend Athletic and Llanharan were relegated into Division 1 West Central and 1 East Central respectively. Unlike previous years, all 4 Division 1 champion clubs were promoted to the Championship. These were Bedlinog, Glamorgan Wanderers, Skewen and Dunvant.

Standings

External links 
 

Welsh Championship
2016–17 in Welsh rugby union
Wales